Team RMG  better known as BMW Team RMG, is a German racing team founded in late 2010 by Stefan Reinhold, in order to race in the DTM in 2012, also coinciding with BMW return to the championship after 20 Years of absence from the championship, despite being a team build from the scratch, they signed 26 employees and many others for the 2012 season, with many previously worked for various racing teams, in 2012 the debut year of the team, Martin Tomczyk the reigning DTM champion from 2011 signed with BMW and he was placed in RMG, while Joey Hand the first American driver to race in a factory squad in the DTM and member from the BMW American Le Mans Series team, was also placed in the team.

The 2012 started strongly for the team with Tomczyk scoring podium finishes at the Red Bull Ring in Austria, at Norisring and in the Nürburgring, however he retired in the next three races and finished 14th in Hockenheimring, while Hand scored points in the Red Bull Ring and in the final race of the season in Hockenheimring ending the year with 6 points, while Tomczyk scored 69 points in the season, scoring three less from his championship year. (The DTM put in place a new points system in the 2012 season). For 2013 Tomczyk will continue with the team while Hand is now placed in BMW Team RBM,  Former 3-time World Touring Car Championship champions driver Andy Priaulx has replaced Hand in Team RMG.

The team is based in Niederzissen, in former Zakspeed headquarters also near the Nürburgring.

Complete Deutsche Tourenwagen Masters results
(key)

*  Season still in progress.
† Driver did not finish, but completed 75% of the race distance.

References

External links
BMW Motorsport  DTM  BMW Team RMG
Interview with Stefan Reinhold in 2012
Team history in DTM website

German auto racing teams
2010 establishments in Germany
Deutsche Tourenwagen Masters teams
BMW in motorsport
Auto racing teams established in 2010